Lawrence Township is one of the fourteen townships of Lawrence County, Ohio, United States. As of the 2010 census the population was 2,579.

Geography
Located in the central part of the county, it borders the following townships:
Aid Township - north
Mason Township - northeast corner
Windsor Township - east
Union Township - southeast corner
Fayette Township - south
Perry Township - southwest
Upper Township - west
Elizabeth Township - northwest

It is the only county township without a border on another county.

No municipalities are located in Lawrence Township, although the unincorporated community of Kitts Hill is located in the western part of the township.

Name and history
Statewide, other Lawrence Townships are located in Stark, Tuscarawas, and Washington counties.

Government
The township is governed by a three-member board of trustees, who are elected in November of odd-numbered years to a four-year term beginning on the following January 1. Two are elected in the year after the presidential election and one is elected in the year before it. There is also an elected township fiscal officer, who serves a four-year term beginning on April 1 of the year after the election, which is held in November of the year before the presidential election. Vacancies in the fiscal officership or on the board of trustees are filled by the remaining trustees.

Education 
The vast majority of educational services in Lawrence Township is provided by the Rock Hill Local School District (Pre-K through 12), although smaller portions are served by the Dawson-Bryant Local School District, and the Symmes Valley Local School District.

References

External links
County website

Townships in Lawrence County, Ohio
Townships in Ohio